Vasil Levski was a Bulgarian revolutionary.

Vasil Levski may also refer to:

Places in Sofia, Bulgaria 
Monument to Vasil Levski, Sofia in the centre of Sofia, the capital of Bulgaria
Vasil Levski Boulevard, major boulevard in the capital of Bulgaria, Sofia
Vasil Levski National Military University, Bulgaria's national military academy
Vasil Levski National Stadium, one of Bulgaria's largest sports venues and the country's second largest stadium
Vasil Levski Stadium Metro Station, station on the Sofia Metro in Bulgaria

Villages in Bulgaria 
, a village in Alfatar Municipality, Bulgaria
, a village in Targovishte Municipality, Bulgaria
, a village in Opan Municipality, Bulgaria
, a village in the municipality of Karlovo, Bulgaria

See also 
 Levski (disambiguation)